Black pig or Black Pig may refer to:

 Berkshire pig, a breed of pig native to England known as kurobuta ("black pig") in Japanese
 Black Iberian pig, a breed of pig native to the Iberian Peninsula
 Large Black pig, a breed of pig native to England
 The Black Pig, or Il Maiale Nero, by Umberto Notari

See also 

 Black Pig's Dyke, in Ireland